Iskra is a rural locality (a village) in Austrumsky Selsoviet, Iglinsky District, Bashkortostan, Russia. The population was 124 as of 2010. There are 5 streets.

Geography 
Iskra is located 28 km east of Iglino (the district's administrative centre) by road. Zavety Ilyicha is the nearest rural locality.

References 

Rural localities in Iglinsky District